HD 193373 (HR 7771) is a solitary red hued star located in the equatorial constellation Delphinus. It has an apparent magnitude of 6.21, placing it near the limit for naked eye visibility.

This is an asymptotic giant branch star with a stellar classification of M1 III. In its current state, the object is fusing hydrogen and helium shells around an inert carbon core. HD 193373 has an iron abundance 120% that of the Sun, making it slightly metal enriched.

References

M-type giants
Asymptotic-giant-branch stars
BD+12 04289
193373
100208
7771
Delphinus (constellation)